Bryan Niebling (born 18 July 1960) is an Australian former professional rugby league footballer who played in the 1980s and 1990s.  Niebling played in the forwards. After a successful Brisbane Rugby League premiership, and representative career for both his state and country, Niebling played in the New South Wales Rugby League premiership for the Brisbane Broncos from their first ever game.

Playing career
Nicknamed 'Horse', Niebling was a constant thorn in the side of New South Wales forwards during the titanic State of Origin clashes of the early 1980s. His career in the State of Origin arena saw him make 9 appearances while playing for Brisbane Valleys and Redcliffe.

Niebling made his Test début in the second row against Great Britain in 1984, and ultimately played in all three matches of Australia's Ashes whitewash.

Named Redcliffe's player of the season and co-winner of the Brisbane Rugby League premiership's Rothmans Medal in 1986, Niebling toured with the unbeaten Kangaroos and played in 10 matches including all five Tests. The last of Niebling's 13 Test appearances was in Australia's 13-6 loss to New Zealand at Lang Park in 1987. He played in Redcliffe's Grand Final loss in 1987 as well.

By the time the Broncos had entered the New South Wales Rugby League premiership in 1988, his career was winding down because of injury. He later played for Hull Kingston Rovers in 1989-91.

References

External links
Player Details at stateoforigin.com.au
Player Profile at yesterdayshero.com.au

1960 births
Living people
Australia national rugby league team players
Australian rugby league players
Brisbane Broncos players
Brisbane rugby league team players
Fortitude Valley Diehards players
Hull Kingston Rovers players
Queensland Rugby League State of Origin players
Redcliffe Dolphins players
Rugby league second-rows
Rugby league players from Queensland
Rugby league props